The Upper Magazine Street Historic District is a historic district encompassing a well-preserved stretch of mid-19th century housing in the Cambridgeport neighborhood of Cambridge, Massachusetts.  It includes two blocks of Magazine Street, between Upton and William Streets, and one block of William Street, between Magazine and Pearl Streets.  The properties in the district include a diversity of architectural styles popular between the 1840s and 1880s.

The district was added to the National Register of Historic Places in 1982.

See also
National Register of Historic Places listings in Cambridge, Massachusetts

References

Historic districts in Middlesex County, Massachusetts
National Register of Historic Places in Cambridge, Massachusetts
Historic districts on the National Register of Historic Places in Massachusetts